Joest may refer to:
Reinhold Joest (born 1937), former race car driver and current team owner
Joest Racing, the team founded by Reinhold Joest
Jan Joest (died 1519), Dutch painter

See also 
 Jost, a surname
 Joesting, a surname